Maximilian Richard "Max" Walscheid (born 13 June 1993) is a German cyclist, who currently rides for UCI WorldTeam .

Career
Walscheid was born in Neuwied. On 23 January 2016, he was one of the six members of  who were hit by a car which drove into on-coming traffic while they were training in Spain. All riders were in stable condition.

In August 2018, he was named in the startlist for the Vuelta a España. In August 2020, he was named in the startlist for the 2020 Tour de France.

During the 2021 Tour de France he won a Wheelie contest which the YouTube channel Tour de Tietema hosted. The wheelie contest was repeated in the 2022 Tour de France during the first rest day and he won thanks to a wheelie of 1420 meters.

Major results

2014
 1st  Road race, National Under-23 Road Championships
 9th Overall Tour de Berlin
1st Stages 4 & 5
2015
 1st Kernen Omloop Echt-Susteren
 2nd Overall Tour de Berlin
1st Stage 4
 5th Zuid Oost Drenthe Classic
 8th Omloop van het Houtland
 10th Velothon Berlin
2016
 Tour of Hainan
1st  Points classification
1st Stages 3, 4, 5, 7 & 9
 2nd Road race, National Road Championships
2017
 1st Stage 5 Danmark Rundt
 5th Omloop van het Houtland
2018
 1st Münsterland Giro
 1st Stage 3 Tour de Yorkshire
 3rd Road race, National Road Championships
 6th Scheldeprijs
2019
 1st Omloop van het Houtland
 2nd Scheldeprijs
 4th Time trial, National Road Championships
 5th Münsterland Giro
2020
 Tour de Langkawi
1st  Points classification
1st Stages 3 & 8
2021
 1st  Team relay, UCI Road World Championships
 UEC European Road Championships
2nd  Team relay
5th Time trial
 3rd Time trial, National Road Championships
 7th Nokere Koerse
 7th Bredene Koksijde Classic
2022
 1st Grand Prix de Denain
 2nd Nokere Koerse
 3rd Münsterland Giro
 4th Classic Brugge–De Panne
 7th Grand Prix d'Isbergues
 10th Trofeo Playa de Palma
2023
 6th Clásica de Almería

Grand Tour general classification results timeline

References

External links

1993 births
Living people
German male cyclists
People from Neuwied
Cyclists from Rhineland-Palatinate
UCI Road World Champions (elite men)